Shaukat Hussain Samrat best known by his screen name Pappu Samrat is a Pakistani veteran choreographer. He has choreographed for music videos, stage shows and has done about more than seventy films including Mujhe Chaand Chahiye for which he won Nigar Award of Best Choreographer at 44th Nigar Awards and recently he has won "Best Choreographer" at 1st ARY Film Awards for Main Hoon Shahid Afridi. He is part of Pakistani choreographer's Samrat Family.

Personal life
Pappu born on 24 feb. 1970 as a Shaukat Hussain to a Pakistani veteran choreographer family, The Samrat Family. Pappu's grandfather, Master Aashiq Hussain where he was a choreographer and dancer, due to his service to dance he was awarded an alias of Samrat Meaning: Mighty and Powerful Pappu's father Akbar Hussain Samrat was also a Pakistani Film choreographer and Papu's brother Khanu was also a veteran choreographer, Family's young sibling and Pappu's niece Vicky is an active choreographer along with his uncle.

Career
Pappu started his career at the age of 19, where he learned dance from his father. He is a trained classical dancer and has done choreography in number of Pakistani films since early 90s to present day and established himself as a firm choreographer. Due to the lack of films and no scope of dancing in Pakistan Pappu describe in an interview on World Dance Day he said "Choreographers are given very limited time here. There isn't any time for rehearsing. Indians excel because Bollywood directors  give a free hand to choreographers and over the years, Indian dancing has won a status for itself. Here, not many films are produced and directors don’t let the choreographers work freely. Dancing is poetry of the body, but here it often becomes an exhibition of the body."

Selected filmography
 Mujhe Chaand Chahiye
 Choorian
 Majajan
 Love Mein Ghum 
 Main Hoon Shahid Afridi

Awards
 Nigar Awards: Best Choreographer - Mujhe Chaand Chahiye 
 ARY Film Awards: Best Choreographer - Main Hoon Shahid Afridi

References

External links
 

Pakistani choreographers
Living people
Nigar Award winners
1970 births